Eva Sorensen was appointed in 2021 as the 11th Ramsay Memorial Professor of Chemical Engineering at UCL, where she is the first woman to head the Department of Chemical Engineering.

In 2018 she was honoured by the Institution of Chemical Engineers (IChemE) with the Frank Morton Medal for promoting best practice in chemical engineering education. The citation read "Medal awarded to Professor Eva Sorensen for being a key driver for innovation in teaching and learning, inside and outside her own institution. She was noted by the committee to have worked tirelessly over several decades to promulgate best practice in chemical engineering education."

References

Further reading 
 

Academics of University College London
British chemical engineers

Living people
Year of birth missing (living people)